The blue-mantled thornbill (Chalcostigma stanleyi) is a species of hummingbird in the "coquettes", tribe Lesbiini of subfamily Lesbiinae. It is found in Bolivia, Ecuador, and Peru.

Taxonomy and systematics

The taxonomy of genus Chalcostigma is unsettled. The South American Classification Committee (SACC) of the American Ornithological Society is considering a proposal to merge the genus into Oxypogon. The blue-mantled thornbill has three recognized subspecies, the nominate C. s. stanleyi (Bourcier, 1851), C. s. versigulare (Zimmer, 1924), and C. s. vulcani (Gould, 1852).

Description

Both sexes have a short straight black bill and a small white spot behind the eye. Adult males of the nominate subspecies are generally dark sooty brown. The crown and nape have a bronzy green sheen, the back reflects violet-blue, and the uppertail coverts are turquoise. The forked tail is steel blue. They have a narrow gorget that is emerald green on the chin and transitions through pink to purple-violet or violet-blue at the lower edge. Adult females are similar, but the gorget has only the green under the chin and the outer tail feathers have pale tips. Juveniles resemble the adult female.

Subspecies C. s. versigulares entire upperparts (not just the back) reflect deep violet-blue, and the lower pink to violet of the gorget is narrower than in the nominate. C. s. vulcani is similar to versigulare but the lower part of its gorget becomes blue-gray or gray-violet.

Distribution and habitat

The nominate subspecies of blue-mantled thornbill is found on both slopes of the Andes of Ecuador between the departments of Carchi and Azauy. C. s. versigulare is found on the Peruvian Andes' east slope from east of the Marañón River south to the Cordillera Carpish in Huánuco Department and also in the Cordillera Blanca on the west slope. C. s. vulcani is found on the eastern Andean slope from southern Peru to Cochabamba Department in central Bolivia.

The blue-mantled thornbill inhabits steep, rocky slopes with somewhat humid páramo grasslands and jalca vegetation. Within those landscapes it favors patches of Polylepis and Gynoxys woodland.

Behavior

Movement

The blue-mantled thornbill is known to temporarily move to lower elevations during periods of harsh weather, so it is hypothesized to also make seasonal elevational migration.

Feeding

The blue-mantled thornbill feeds on the nectar of small flowers such as Berberis, Gaultheria, Ribes, and Gentiana. It defends feeding territories. It has been observed gleaning tiny insects from the underside of Gynoxys leaves while clinging to them. It also picks insects from matted grass or rocks by hopping among them, and occasionally sallies to take insects on the wing.

Breeding

The blue-mantled thornbill is believed to breed during the rainy season. As is typical of hummingbirds, the female alone incubates the two white eggs. Nothing else has been documented about its breeding phenology.

Vocalization

The blue-mantled thornbill's calls have been described as "a descending squeaky twitter followed by a mellower upslurred note" and "a downslurred 'tseetsitsitsitsitr-whee-tsew' [with] variations."

Status

The IUCN has assessed the blue-mantled thornbill as being of Least Concern. It has a large range but its population size is unknown and believed to be decreasing. Though it is generally fairly common, it is locally under threat by destruction of Polylepis woodlands and conversion of natural grasslands to pasture.

References

Additional reading

blue-mantled thornbill
Birds of the Ecuadorian Andes
Birds of the Peruvian Andes
Birds of the Bolivian Andes
blue-mantled thornbill
blue-mantled thornbill
Taxonomy articles created by Polbot